Servette is a district in the city of Geneva, Switzerland

Servette may also refer to:

Servette FC, a Swiss football club based in Geneva.
Genève-Servette HC, a Geneva-based professional ice hockey team

See also 

 Servetto